Psychosaura agmosticha is a species of skink found in Brazil.

References

Psychosaura
Reptiles described in 2000
Reptiles of Brazil
Endemic fauna of Brazil
Taxa named by Miguel Trefaut Rodrigues